Wheatfields may refer to:

 Wheatfields, Gila County, Arizona, a Census-designated place 
 Wheatfields, Apache County, Arizona, a populated place

See also
Wheatfield (disambiguation)